Beasts is a 1976 British television series. Written by Nigel Kneale, it is an anthology of six self-contained episodes that feature the recurring theme of bestial horror. The series was made by ATV for the ITV Network.

Format
Each episode was based around some form of beastial horror while avoiding typical monster horror clichès, more so focusing on psychological and supernatural themes. For example, "The Dummy" and "What Big Eyes" are psychological horrors focusing on men who think they are the creatures they obsess over, and "Buddy Boy", "Special Offer" and "Baby" have supernatural elements. "During Barty's Party" is the only episode to have actual 'beasts' as the main threat, them being large rats.

Episodes

DVD release
The series was released on DVD by Network in 2006. This set also included a similarly themed TV play called Murrain that Kneale had written for ITV's Against the Crowd series in 1975.

References

External links

Beasts at the BFI's Screenonline

1970s British drama television series
1976 British television series debuts
1976 British television series endings
ITV television dramas
1970s British anthology television series
British supernatural television shows
British horror fiction television series
Television series by ITV Studios
Television shows produced by Associated Television (ATV)
English-language television shows